La Planche des Belles Filles is a ski station in the Vosges Mountains, in France. It is located in the Haute-Saône département. Since 2012, the climb to the summit has been used several times during the Tour de France cycle race.

Etymology and legend

The name Belles Filles literally means "beautiful girls", but is actually derived from the local plant life. The mountain is attested from the 16th century as  lieu peuplé de belles fahys, a "place inhabited with nice beech trees" in the local dialect. Belles fahys later became corrupted into Belles Filles, though there remains a nearby village of Belfahy. Meanwhile, Planche, "board", is derived from the nearby small town of Plancher-les-Mines.

A folk etymology, in contrast, holds that the mountain took its name from the time of the Thirty Years' War. According to legend, young women from Plancher-les-Mines fled into the mountains to escape Swedish mercenaries as they feared being raped and massacred. Rather than surrender, they decided to commit suicide and jumped into a lake far below. One of the soldiers then took a board on which, with his dagger, he engraved an epitaph for the "beautiful girls".  A wooden statue, created by a local artist, is a reminder of the legend.

Cycle racing

Tour de France
La Planche des Belles Filles was first used as a finish in Stage 7 in the 2012 Tour de France,  from Tomblaine on 7 July. The stage was won by Chris Froome with his  team-mate Bradley Wiggins taking the race lead. The steep finish proved popular, and it quickly became a popular climb among cycling fans. The climb has since been used frequently; in 2014 it was the finish of Stage 10 and won by then race leader Vincenzo Nibali; in 2017 it was the finish of Stage 5 of the Tour, with Fabio Aru winning by 16 seconds from Dan Martin, and Chris Froome taking the yellow jersey. It featured again in 2019, won by Dylan Teuns. 

It was the penultimate stage finish in a mountain time-trial in stage 20 of the 2020 Tour de France, which was won by Tadej Pogačar, who also took the yellow jersey and the polka-dot jersey.

Le Tour de France Femmes

La Planche des Belles Filles featured in the premiere event of Le Tour de France Femmes in 2022 as the finish of the final stage (stage 8) on July 31.

References

External links

Official website 
 Cycling profile, map, photos of climb  
 Profile of climb

Ski stations in France
Skiing in the Vosges
Tourist attractions in Haute-Saône
Tourist attractions in the Territoire de Belfort
Sports venues in Haute-Saône
Bourgogne-Franche-Comté region articles needing translation from French Wikipedia